Navas may refer to:

 Navas (surname), a Spanish surname
 Navas, Sant Andreu, a neighborhood of Barcelona, Catalonia, Spain
 Navas (Barcelona Metro), a railway station in the Sant Andreu district, Spain
 Navàs, a town and municipality in the province of Barcelona, Catalonia, Spain

Las Navas may refer to:
 Las Navas, Northern Samar, a municipality in the Philippines
 Las Navas de Jadraque, municipality in the province of Guadalajara, Castile-La Mancha, Spain
 Las Navas del Marqués, municipality in the province of Ávila, Castile and León, Spain
 Las Navas de la Concepción, village in the province of Seville, Andalusia, Spain

See also
 Nava (disambiguation)